Monte Leone is the highest mountain of the Lepontine Alps and is located on the border between Switzerland and Italy. The mountain stands on the extreme west of the Lepontine Alps, a few kilometres east of Simplon Pass.

Etymology 
Leone in Italian means lion, and the mountain's name is said to come from the look of its south face's profile. A different origin of the name could be Munt d'l'Aiun, which in the local dialect means Aiun's mountain; Aione is a nearby village and mount Leone is situated close to meadows traditionally owned by the villagers.

Geography 
In the SOIUSA (International Standardized Mountain Subdivision of the Alps) the mountain belongs to an alpine subsection of Lepontine Alps called "North-Western Lepontine Alps"  (It:Alpi del Monte Leone e del San Gottardo; De:Monte Leone-Sankt Gotthard-Alpen).

See also
List of mountains of Valais
List of mountains of Switzerland
List of most isolated mountains of Switzerland

References

External links
Monte Leone on Summitpost

Mountains of the Alps
Alpine three-thousanders
Mountains of Switzerland
Mountains of Piedmont
Italy–Switzerland border
International mountains of Europe
Mountains of Valais
Lepontine Alps